The Edgerton Highway is a minor highway in the U.S. state of Alaska that extends  from the Richardson Highway near Copper Center to the town of Chitina. The McCarthy Road, within the Wrangell-Saint Elias National Park and Preserve, is a  extension from Chitina to McCarthy.

The Edgerton Highway, named for U.S. Army Major General Glen Edgar Edgerton, a member of the Alaska Road Commission, follows an old pack trail along the Copper River, and is paved. The popular dip-net salmon fishery in Chitina causes the highway to be fairly heavily used in summer. It is part of Alaska Route 10.

Route description
The Edgerton Highway begins at its junction with the Richardson Highway at Pippin Lake in the rural community of Kenny Lake. The highway travels east-northeast through rural Kenny Lake before reaching an intersection with the Old Edgerton Highway and turning southeast. The highway continues through several miles of forest along the Copper River, crossing several small affluents. The roadway passes the Chitina Airport, ending at its junction with the McCarthy Road after passing through the very small town of Chitina.

Recreation site

Liberty Falls State Recreation Site is located at mile 23 of the highway. It is one of the smaller units of the Alaska State Parks system, at only . The site features a small campground and picnic area and, as the name suggests, a close-up view of a waterfall and the canyon created by Liberty Creek as it runs down to the Copper River.

Major junctions

References

Copper River Census Area, Alaska
State highways in Alaska
Transportation in Unorganized Borough, Alaska